Nueva Numancia is a station on Line 1 of the Madrid Metro, in the Puente de Vallecas district of the Spanish capital. Accessible from numbers 47, 54, 69 and 76 of the Avenida de la Albufera, it was opened on 2 July 1962. It is located in fare Zone A.

References 

Line 1 (Madrid Metro) stations
Railway stations in Spain opened in 1962
Buildings and structures in Puente de Vallecas District, Madrid